Yommalath is a district (muang) of Khammouane province in mid-Laos. The district was damaged by floods caused by heavy rain in July 2011, affecting rice farmland in the district, inundating almost 700 hectares, destroying dozens of fishponds and killing 112 cattle.

Towns and villages
Ban Kenglek

References

External links
www-wds.worldbank.org

Districts of Khammouane province